Vahe Alberti Hakobyan (born June 12, 1971, in Yerevan) is an Armenian politician currently serving in the National Assembly of Armenia as a member of the opposition Armenia Alliance. He previously served as the governor of Syunik Province of Armenia from October 6, 2016, until June 2018. Prior to that, from 1996 to 1999, he was first deputy director general at the mining company Zangezur Copper and Molybdenum Combine. A former member of Armenia's Republican Party, in March 2021 he founded the political party Reborn Armenia, which he currently chairs. The party participated in the 2021 Armenian parliamentary election in an electoral alliance with the Armenian Revolutionary Federation and former president Robert Kocharyan. He is married with two daughters.

Footnotes

External links
Vahe Hakobyan - Armenia alliance

1971 births
Living people
Governors of Syunik
Politicians from Yerevan